The Federal Correctional Complex, Beaumont (FCC Beaumont) is a United States federal prison complex for male inmates in unincorporated Jefferson County, Texas. It is operated by the Federal Bureau of Prisons, a division of the United States Department of Justice.

The complex consists of three facilities:

 Federal Correctional Institution, Beaumont Low (FCI Beaumont Low): a low-security facility.
 Federal Correctional Institution, Beaumont Medium (FCI Beaumont Medium): a medium-security facility.
 United States Penitentiary, Beaumont (USP Beaumont): a high-security facility.

See also
 Federal Bureau of Prisons
 Incarceration in the United States
 List of U.S. federal prisons

References

1998 establishments in Texas
Beaumont
Prisons in Jefferson County, Texas